The first cabinet of Múte Bourup Egede was the Greenlandic government from 23 April 2021 to 4 April 2022. It was a coalition consisting of the left-wing Inuit Ataqatigiit and the centrist Naleraq. It was replaced by the Egede's second cabinet, when Siumut replaced Naleraq.

List of ministers

|}

See also 
Cabinet of Greenland

References

Government of Greenland
Coalition governments
Politics of Greenland
Political organisations based in Greenland
Egede
Cabinets established in 2021
2021 in Greenland
Greenland politics-related lists